Patrick Hart Cash (born 27 May 1965) is an Australian former professional tennis player. He reached a career-high ATP singles ranking of world No. 4 in May 1988 and a career-high ATP doubles ranking of world No. 6 in August 1988. Upon winning the 1987 singles title at Wimbledon, Cash climbed into the stands to celebrate, starting a tradition that has continued ever since.

Early life
Cash is the son of Pat Cash Sr., who played for the Hawthorn Football Club in the 1950s.

Career

Junior years
Cash came to the tennis world's attention as a prominent and promising junior player in the early 1980s. He was awarded a scholarship at the Australian Institute of Sport. He was ranked the No. 1 junior player in the world in 1981.

In June 1982, Cash won the junior doubles title at the French Open partnering John Frawley. In July he won the junior singles title at Wimbledon, and while partnering Frawley, he also won the junior doubles title at the same tournament. In September, he won the junior singles title at the US Open, and while partnering Frawley, he was also the runner-up of the junior doubles at the same tournament.

Professional years
Cash turned professional in late 1982 and won his first top-level singles title that year in Melbourne.

In 1983, Cash became the youngest player to play in a Davis Cup final. He won the decisive singles rubber against Joakim Nyström as Australia defeated Sweden 3–2 to claim the cup.

In 1984, Cash reached the singles semifinals at both Wimbledon and the US Open. He lost in three sets in the Wimbledon semifinals to John McEnroe and was defeated in the semifinals at the US Open by Ivan Lendl, who won their match in a fifth-set tiebreaker. This day is regarded as one of the greatest days in US Open history because it featured the three set thriller women's final Chris Evert vs Martina Navratilova and a John McEnroe vs Jimmy Connors five set marathon semifinal – creating the day now known as 'Super Saturday'. Cash finished the year in top 10 for the first time.

Cash was the runner-up in the doubles competition at Wimbledon in both 1984 with Paul McNamee and 1985 with John Fitzgerald.

In 1986, he helped Australia regain the Davis Cup with a 3–2 victory over Sweden. Cash again won the decisive singles rubber, recovering from two sets down against Mikael Pernfors. Just prior to Wimbledon in 1986, Cash had an emergency appendix operation. He reached the quarterfinals of the competition, and during the championship he started the now common tradition of throwing wristbands and headbands into the crowd.

1987 was a particularly strong year for Cash. He reached five singles finals, of which two were Grand Slam finals. Cash reached his first Grand Slam singles final at the Australian Open, where he lost in five sets to Stefan Edberg. This was the last Australian Open played at Kooyong on a grass court.
The crowning moment of Cash's career came in 1987 at Wimbledon. Having already beaten Marcel Freeman, Paul McNamee, Michiel Schapers, Guy Forget, Mats Wilander in the quarterfinals and Jimmy Connors in the semifinals, Cash defeated the world No. 1, Ivan Lendl, in the final in straight sets. Cash sealed the victory by climbing into the stands and up to the player's box at Centre Court, where he celebrated with his family, girlfriend, and coach, Ian Barclay. He thus started a Wimbledon tradition that has been followed by many other champions at Wimbledon and other Grand Slam tournaments since. He only dropped one set during the entire tournament. He finished the year ranked at No. 7.

In 1988, Cash reached the Australian Open final for the second consecutive year and faced another Swede, Mats Wilander. It was the first men's singles final played at the new Melbourne Park venue on hard court, and Wilander won in a four-and-a-half-hour encounter, taking the fifth set 8–6. It was the first Grand Slam final in history to be played indoors after rain delays forced the closing of the roof midway through the match. Cash also reached his career-high ranking of world No. 4 in May.

Coming in as the defending champion in 1988 at Wimbledon, Cash was seeded fourth and only dropped two sets (both during the second round) en route to quarterfinal, but his run came to an end when he lost to sixth seed and eventual runner-up Boris Becker. It was the last time he reached the quarterfinals at a Grand Slam tournament in singles. 1988 was the last time Cash ended the year in the top 20, finishing the year ranked 20th, after having been ranked inside the top 10 from the start of the year until 21 November.

In April 1989, Cash ruptured his Achilles tendon at the Japan Open and was out of action until March 1990.

Cash played in his third Davis Cup final in 1990. This time, Australia lost 2–3 to the United States.

Cash continued to play on the circuit on-and-off through the mid-1990s. A series of back to back injuries to his Achilles tendon, knees, and back prevented him from recapturing his best form after winning Wimbledon in 1987. He won his last top-level singles title in April 1990 at the Hong Kong Open. His last doubles title came in 1996 at the U.S. Men's Clay Court Championships with Pat Rafter.

Cash established a reputation on the tour as a hard-fighting serve-and-volleyer and for wearing his trademark black-and-white checked headband and his cross earring. For most of his career, Cash was coached by Melbourne-born tennis coach Ian Barclay.

Post-retirement

Since his retirement from the tour in 1997, Cash has resided mainly in London. He is the host of CNN's tennis-focused magazine show Open Court, and has also worked as a TV co-commentator, primarily for the BBC. Cash continues to be a draw card on both the ATP and Champions Cup legends tours. He won the Hall of Fame event in Newport Rhode Island in 2008 and 2009. He has coached top players including Greg Rusedski and Mark Philippoussis.

Cash opened a tennis academy on the Gold Coast of Australia and is also opening academies in Ko Samui, Thailand and in the Caribbean St Vincent, St Lucia and Dominican Republic.

Cash was inducted into the Sport Australia Hall of Fame in 2005.

Cash won the over-45s Wimbledon doubles title with fellow Australian Mark Woodforde in 2010, 2011, 2012 and 2013. In November 2014, he played in the inaugural Champions Tennis League in India.

In 2022, Cash appeared on the third British series of The Masked Singer masked as "Bagpipes". He was fourth to be unmasked.

Personal life
In his early twenties, Cash had two children with his then-girlfriend, Norwegian model Anne-Britt Kristiansen. They have a son and a daughter. From 1990 through 2002 Cash was married to Brazilian Emily Bendit. They have twin boys.  In 2010, Cash became a grandfather at age 44 when his daughter gave birth to a daughter.

Cash was criticised for stating in an August 2021 interview with The Conservative Woman, broadcast online, that he had been taking Ivermectin for more than 15 months, claiming that "I'm living proof that I have been in the worst areas everywhere around the world and I haven't come close to getting COVID", despite the lack of evidence for the safety or efficacy of the drug for such measures.

Grand Slam finals

Singles: 3 (1 title, 2 runner-ups)

Doubles (2 runner-ups)

ATP career finals

Singles: 11 (6 titles, 5 runner-ups)

Doubles (11 titles, 6 runner-ups)

Junior Grand Slam finals

Boys' singles: 3 (2–1)

Performance timelines

Singles
Walkovers are neither official wins nor official losses.

Top 10 wins

Senior Tour titles
 2000 – London Masters, U.K. (Blackrock Tour of Champions)
 2001 – Graz, Austria (Blackrock Tour of Champions)

References

External links

 Official Pat Cash website
 
 
 
 
 Pat Cash at the ATP Champions Tour
 

1965 births
Living people
Australian expatriate sportspeople in England
Australian male tennis players
Australian people of American descent
Australian people of Irish descent
British sports broadcasters
French Open junior champions
Hopman Cup competitors
Olympic tennis players of Australia
Tennis players from Melbourne
Australian tennis commentators
Tennis players at the 1984 Summer Olympics
US Open (tennis) junior champions
Wimbledon champions
Wimbledon junior champions
Australian Institute of Sport tennis players
Grand Slam (tennis) champions in men's singles
Sport Australia Hall of Fame inductees
Grand Slam (tennis) champions in boys' singles
Grand Slam (tennis) champions in boys' doubles
People educated at Marcellin College, Bulleen
Australian tennis coaches